Robert Malone Bugg was an American politician and a member of the United States House of Representatives for Tennessee's 7th congressional district.

Biography
Bugg was born in Boydton, Virginia in Mecklenburg County on January 20, 1805, the son of John and Sarah Malone Bugg. He attended public schools. He married Martha Patsy Laird, and they had nine children, Ann Mariah, Zachariah Pennington, John Laird, Sarah Elizabeth, Robert Malone, Henry Martin, Samantha, George Booth, and Martha Mildred.

Career
Bugg moved to Tennessee, and settled in Williamson County in 1825, where he taught school for several years. He then moved to Giles County and engaged in agricultural pursuits. He was a justice of the peace in 1840. He served as a member of the Tennessee House of Representatives in 1851 and 1852.

Elected as a Whig to the Thirty-third Congress, Bugg served from March 4, 1853 to March 3, 1855, but he declined to be a candidate for renomination in 1854.  He resumed agricultural pursuits, and served in the Tennessee Senate in 1871 and 1872.

Death
Bugg died in Lynnville, Tennessee in Giles County on February 18, 1887 (age 82 years, 29 days). He is interred at McLaurine Cemetery near Lynnville, Tennessee.

References

External links

Members of the Tennessee House of Representatives
Tennessee state senators
1805 births
1887 deaths
People from Boydton, Virginia
People from Williamson County, Tennessee
Whig Party members of the United States House of Representatives from Tennessee
19th-century American politicians